Kristen Thompson is an American politician who is the Oklahoma Senate member from the 22nd district.

Early life and career
Thompson received her undergraduate degree in communication sciences and disorders from the University of Oklahoma. She owns a general contracting company and restaurant group with her husband.

Oklahoma Senate
Thompson challenged incumbent State Senator Jake A. Merrick in the 2022 Republican Primary. During the primary she was endorsed by Oklahoma Governor Kevin Stitt and received support from pro-school vouchers organizations. She won the primary election and faced Democratic candidate Blake Aguirre. She won the November general election with 60% of the vote and assumed office November 16, 2022.

References

21st-century American politicians
21st-century American women politicians
Living people
Republican Party Oklahoma state senators
Women state legislators in Oklahoma
Year of birth missing (living people)